Senator Gifford may refer to:

Charles L. C. Gifford (1825–1877), New Jersey State Senate
Charles L. Gifford (1871–1947), Massachusetts State Senate
Gabby Giffords (born 1970), Arizona State Senate